Dormans railway station  is on the  branch of the Oxted line in southern England and serves Dormansland and Dormans Park in Surrey. The station is managed by Southern.

History

The line through Dormans was electrified with 750 V DC third rail in 1987.

Facilities and Connections

Dormans station has a ticket office (with waiting area) which is staffed during Monday-Friday mornings only (06:30-10:15). There is a self-service ticket machine at the station although there are no ticket barriers. Passenger help points and seated areas can be found on both platforms. There is also a small cycle storage area at the entrance to the station.

The London bound platform at the station is accessible however the East Grinstead platform is only reachable by the stepped footbridge so isn't accessible.

The Metrobus operated 281 bus route stops close to the entrance of the station and provides hourly connections to Lingfield and Crawley.

Services
Off-peak, all services at Dormans are operated by Southern using  EMUs.

The typical off-peak service in trains per hour is:
 1 tph to  via 
 1 tph to 

During the peak hours and on weekends, the service is increased to 2 tph in each direction.

These services are operated using  EMUs.

References

External links 

Railway stations in Surrey
Former London, Brighton and South Coast Railway stations
Railway stations in Great Britain opened in 1884
Railway stations served by Govia Thameslink Railway